Alexander Alexandrovich Shevchenko (born 29 November 2000) is a Russian tennis player.

Shevchenko has a career high ATP singles ranking of No. 101 achieved on 20 March 2023 and a career-high ATP doubles ranking of No. 406 achieved on 20 February 2023.

Career

In 2022, Shevchenko qualified into the main draw at the ATP 500 2022 Astana Open.

In February 2023, he also qualified at the ATP 500 in 2023 Dubai as a lucky loser. As a result he reached a new career high of No. 113 on 6 February 2023.
In March, he reached his second Challenger final of the season as a qualifier in Phoenix, Arizona defeating Gael Monfils, sixth seed Marc-Andrea Hüsler, top seed Matteo Berrettini and Quentin Halys before losing to Nuno Borges in the final. As a result he moved to a new career high, one position shy of the top 100 on 20 March 2023.

Challenger and Futures/World Tennis Tour Finals

Singles: 11 (6–4)

Doubles: 5 (2–3)

References

External links
 
 
 

2000 births
Living people
Sportspeople from Rostov-on-Don
Russian male tennis players